Sir John Clarke George, KBE, CStJ (16 October 190114 October 1972) was a British coalminer and politician. He was one of a very small number of Conservative Members of Parliament to have been working miners.

Early life
George's father, also called John Clarke George, was a miner from Fife. After attending Ballingry Public School until the age of 14, George began work in the coal mines. However he later trained for management, and rose through the ranks; by 1938 he was appointed Manager of New Cumnock Collieries.

Business life
In 1946, he left the mining industry (the act nationalising the industry was passed that year), and became manager of Alloa Glass Works. At this point, he became active in politics as a Unionist and, in 1949, he was elected to Clackmannanshire County Council. He was an unsuccessful Parliamentary candidate in South Ayrshire in the 1950 general election, but was elected to Alloa Town Council in 1951. He was awarded the CBE in 1952.

Constitutional problem
At the 1955 general election, George was elected to Parliament as a Unionist for Glasgow Pollok (the Scottish Unionists took the Conservative whip). Almost immediately he was the trigger for a minor constitutional crisis when it was observed that he was a Director of Scottish Slate Industries, a nationalised industry, having been appointed by the Ministry of Works in February 1947. Although George had not received any remuneration, it was possible that it might be an 'office of profit under the Crown' which would disqualify him from election.

The matter was referred to a Select Committee, while the government rushed through a Bill to change the law. The Committee found that, under the law as it stood, George was disqualified. A bill to indemnify George from the consequences of having acted as an MP while disqualified, and validate his election, was also passed.

Parliamentary career
George often spoke about the mining industry in Parliament. In 1957, he opposed the decontrol of rents which had been brought in by the Conservative government. However, this did not harm his career and in October 1959 he was appointed Parliamentary Secretary to the Ministry of Power with responsibility for the coal industry, a job he held until June 1962. In 1963, he was made a Knight Commander of the Order of the British Empire and appointed Chairman of the Unionist Party in Scotland.

He stood down from Parliament at the 1964 general election, and retired from his party posts in 1965, returning to business as Chairman of Scottish Rexco Ltd and Preswick Precision Products Ltd.

References
M. Stenton and S. Lees, "Who's Who of British MPs" Vol. IV (Harvester Press, 1981)
The Times

External links 
 

1901 births
1972 deaths
Commanders of the Order of St John
Unionist Party (Scotland) councillors
Knights Commander of the Order of the British Empire
Members of the Parliament of the United Kingdom for Scottish constituencies
Scottish miners
UK MPs 1955–1959
UK MPs 1959–1964
Unionist Party (Scotland) MPs
People from Ballingry
20th-century Scottish businesspeople
Ministers in the Macmillan and Douglas-Home governments, 1957–1964